Andrew Roy Gibb (5 March 1958 – 10 March 1988) was an English singer, songwriter, and actor. He was the younger brother of Barry, Robin and Maurice, who went on to form the Bee Gees.

Gibb came to prominence in the late 1970s through the early 1980s with eight singles reaching the Top 20 of the US Hot 100, three of which went to number-one: "I Just Want to Be Your Everything" (1977), "(Love Is) Thicker Than Water" (1977), and "Shadow Dancing" (1978). In the early 1980s, he co-hosted the American music television series Solid Gold. He also performed in a production of The Pirates of Penzance and Joseph and the Amazing Technicolor Dreamcoat. Gibb would later have issues with drug addiction and depression. He died on 10 March 1988, five days after his 30th birthday.

Life and career

1958–1975: Early life and first recordings
Andrew Roy Gibb was born on 5 March 1958 at Stretford Memorial Hospital in Stretford, Lancashire. He was the youngest of five children born to Barbara and Hugh Gibb. His mother was of Irish and English descent, and his father was of Scottish and English descent. He had four siblings: his sister, Lesley Evans; and three brothers—Barry and fraternal twins Robin and Maurice.

At the age of six months, Andy Gibb emigrated with his family to Queensland, Australia, settling on Cribb Island just north of Brisbane. After moving several times between Brisbane and Sydney, Andy returned to the United Kingdom in January 1967 as his three older brothers began to gain international fame as the Bee Gees.

In his childhood, his mother, Barbara, described Andy as "A little devil, a little monster. I'd send him off to school, but he'd sneak off to the stable and sleep with his two horses all day. He'd wander back home around lunchtime smelling of horse manure, yet he'd swear he had been at school. Oh, he was a little monkey!"

Producer and film director Tom Kennedy described Andy's personality in his childhood:
 He quit school at the age of 13, and with an acoustic guitar given to him by his older brother Barry, he began playing at tourist clubs around Ibiza, Spain (when his parents moved there), and later on the Isle of Man, his brothers' birthplace, where his parents were living at the time.

In June 1974, Gibb formed his first group, Melody Fayre (named after a Bee Gees song), which included Isle of Man musicians John Alderson on guitar, Stan Hughes on bass, and John Stringer on drums. The group was managed by Andy's mother, Barbara, and had regular bookings on the small island's hotel circuit. Gibb's first recording, in August 1973, was a Maurice Gibb composition, "My Father Was a Rebel", which Maurice also produced and played on. It was not released. Another track on the session performed by him was "Windows of My World," co-written by him and Maurice.

At the urging of his brother Barry, Gibb returned to Australia in 1974. Barry believed that, because Australia had been a good training ground for the Bee Gees, it would also help his youngest brother. Lesley Gibb had remained in Australia, where she raised a family with her husband. Both Alderson and Stringer followed Andy to Australia with the hope of forming a band there. With Col Joye producing, Andy, Alderson, and Stringer recorded a number of Andy's compositions. The first song was a demo called "To a Girl" (with his brother Maurice playing organ), which he later performed on his television debut in Australia on The Ernie Sigley Show. Sigley later informed the audience that it was from Gibb's forthcoming album, but it was never released. In November of the same year, he recorded six demos—again produced by Joye—including "Words and Music", "Westfield Mansions", and "Flowing Rivers" (which was later released). What may have detracted from the "training ground" aspect of Australia for Andy compared with his brothers was that Andy was relatively independent financially, mainly because of his brothers' support and their largesse; hence, the group's sporadic work rate. Andy would disappear for periods of time, leaving Alderson and Stringer out of work with no income. Despondent, Alderson and Stringer returned to the UK.

Gibb later joined the band Zenta, consisting of Gibb on vocals, Rick Alford on guitar, Paddy Lelliot on bass, Glen Greenhalgh on vocals, and Trevor Norton on drums. Zenta supported international artists Sweet and the Bay City Rollers on the Sydney leg of their Australian tours. "Can't Stop Dancing" (which was a Ray Stevens song and was later a US hit for duo Captain and Tennille in May 1977) was mooted for release, but didn't happen, although Gibb did perform it on television at least once on the revitalised Bandstand show hosted by Daryl Somers. Zenta would appear later as a backing band for Gibb, but did not participate on Gibb's recording sessions around 1975, which featured Australian jazz fusion group Crossfire.

"Words and Music" was released on the ATA label, only in Australia and New Zealand, owned by Joye. It was his first single, the song, backed by another Andy Gibb composition "Westfield Mansions". The single would eventually reach the Top Twenty on the Sydney music charts in 1976; the ballad was one of his well-known hits.

1976–1980: International success
Gibb married his girlfriend, Kim Reeder, on 11 July 1976, and in 1977 they moved to West Hollywood. Reeder recalled, "He became ensconced in the drug scene. Cocaine became his first love. He became depressed and paranoid." After they split up, Reeder moved back to Australia, where she gave birth to their daughter, Peta, who was born on 25 January 1978, and they divorced later that year.

Robert Stigwood, who at the time was the Bee Gees' manager, signed Andy to his label, RSO Records in early 1976, after he heard some of Andy's demo tapes. Andy soon moved to Miami Beach, Florida, to begin working on songs with his brother Barry and co-producers Albhy Galuten and Karl Richardson. In late 1976 in Miami, Andy, with older brother Barry producing and recording in the famed Criteria Studios, set about making his first album Flowing Rivers. Eagles guitarist Joe Walsh played on two songs on the album. The first release from the album, and Gibb's first single released outside Australia, was "I Just Want to Be Your Everything" which was written by Barry, who also provided backup vocals. It reached number-one in the United States and Australia and was the most played record of the year. In Britain it was a lesser hit, just scraping into the Top 30. Eight of the ten tracks on the album were Andy Gibb compositions, mostly songs written during his time in Australia. These included a re-recording of his previous single, "Words and Music". In September 1977 Flowing Rivers, with another number-one single "(Love Is) Thicker Than Water" (also co-written by Gibb and his brother Barry) to support it, quickly became a million-selling album. That single broke in early 1978 during the time that the Bee Gees' contributions to the Saturday Night Fever soundtrack were dominating the world charts. In the United States it replaced "Stayin' Alive" at the top of the Hot 100 on the day before Andy's 20th birthday, only to be surpassed by "Night Fever" at number-one there two weeks later.

Andy then began work with the Gibb-Galuten-Richardson production team on his second album, Shadow Dancing, which was released in April 1978 and was his highest-charting album in America and Canada. The title track, written by all four Gibb brothers, was released as a single in the United States in April 1978. In mid-June it began a seven-week run at number-one, achieving platinum status and the honour of being Billboard's number-one song of 1978. In the United States, Gibb became the first male solo artist to have three consecutive number-one singles on the Billboard Hot 100, with all of the weeks at the top of the chart happening in less than year, from 30 July 1977 through 29 July 1978. Two further Top Ten singles, "An Everlasting Love" (which reached number 5) and "(Our Love) Don't Throw It All Away" (which reached number 9), were released from the album, which became another million seller.

In 1979, Gibb performed along with the Bee Gees, ABBA and Olivia Newton-John (duet with "Rest Your Love on Me") at the Music for UNICEF Concert at the United Nations General Assembly, which was broadcast worldwide. He returned to the studio to begin recording sessions for his final full studio album After Dark. In March 1980, the last of Gibb's Top Ten singles charted just ahead of the album's release. "Desire" was recorded for the Bee Gees' 1979 album Spirits Having Flown and featured their original track, complete with Andy's original "guest vocal" track. A second single, "I Can't Help It", a duet with family friend and fellow British and Australian expat Olivia Newton-John, reached the top 20.

Later in the year, Andy Gibb's Greatest Hits was released as a finale to his contract with RSO Records, with two new songs: "Time Is Time" (number 15 in January 1981) and "Me (Without You)" (Gibb's last top-40 chart entry) shipped as singles, before RSO founder Robert Stigwood let him go due to his cocaine addiction and behavioural problems. "After Dark" and "Will You Still Love Me Tomorrow" were non-single songs added to the album, the latter of which was a duet with P. P. Arnold, who had previously worked with Barry Gibb, including singing uncredited backups on "Bury Me Down by the River" from Cucumber Castle.

Around the same time, Gibb was invited to sing the first verse on Queen's "Play the Game", and lead singer Freddie Mercury apparently was amazed with Gibb's abilities. According to some sources, the tape was found in 1990 in a search of Queen archives for bonus tracks for a CD but was not used. Since it has not been heard by any Queen collectors, its existence is somewhat doubtful, although record producer Mack has also confirmed that the version did exist.

1981–1986: Decline and live performances

While taping The John Davidson Show in January 1981, Gibb met actress Victoria Principal. During their high-profile relationship, Gibb began working on several projects outside the recording studio. He co-hosted the television music show Solid Gold from 1981 to 1982 with Marilyn McCoo. He also performed in Gilbert & Sullivan's The Pirates of Penzance in Los Angeles and Andrew Lloyd Webber's Joseph and the Amazing Technicolor Dreamcoat on Broadway. Gibb was ultimately fired from both Joseph and Solid Gold because of absenteeism caused by cocaine binges.
Said Zev Buffman, a Broadway producer and financier for Joseph, "When Andy was at the theater, he was a joy. But he wasn't there enough", adding that of the five people to play Joseph up to that point, Gibb was the best actor. He also said after Gibb's death, "We'd lose him over long weekends. He'd come back on Tuesday, and he'd look beat. He was like a little puppy—so ashamed when he did something wrong. He was all heart, but he didn't have enough muscle to carry through." An unnamed co-star in Joseph was quoted as saying, "I hear he spent most of his time in his hotel room in front of the TV. I guess he was frightened and insecure. That's what happens when you're the baby brother of the Bee Gees." Commenting after Gibb's death, Solid Gold producer Brad Lachman stated, "...[Andy] was a very charming, vulnerable and charismatic performer. He clearly meant well. He wasn't being difficult. He was going through problems he couldn't deal with. He wanted everyone to love him. He had so much going for him, and he just couldn't believe it."

In August 1981, Gibb and Principal released a duet of the Everly Brothers' "All I Have to Do Is Dream". He reportedly heard her singing in the shower and convinced her to go into the studio with him. This would be Gibb's last official single, and his last US chart entry, peaking at number 51. Their romance ended shortly thereafter when she gave him an ultimatum to choose between her or drugs. After this, Gibb began dating Kari Michaelsen of the NBC television sitcom Gimme a Break! on which he guest starred.

In 1984 and 1985, Gibb did finish two successful contracts at the Riviera hotel in Las Vegas.

His family convinced him to seek treatment for his drug addiction, which included a stay at the Betty Ford Center in 1985. It was during this time that Gibb began touring small venues with a stage show featuring his hits as well as covers.  He also appeared in guest-starring roles on television sitcom Punky Brewster and Gimme a Break!  Following an extensive tour of East Asia, he regularly performed shows in Las Vegas and Lake Tahoe. In 1984, he was the headline performer at the Viña del Mar Festival in Chile, performing two nights in a row. He also held a two-week engagement at San Francisco's historic Fairmont Hotel in March 1986.

1987–1988: Attempted comeback and final days
In the spring of 1987, Gibb went through another drug rehabilitation program and thought he had finally beaten his habits.

Gibb now aimed to get a recording contract for release of a new album in 1988. He returned to the studio in June 1987 recording four songs; one of them, "Man on Fire", was released posthumously in 1991 on a Polydor Records anthology. Another track, "Arrow Through the Heart", was the final song Andy would ever record and was featured on an episode of VH1's series, Behind the Music, and released on the Bee Gees' Mythology 4-disc box set in November 2010. The songs are co-written by Gibb with his brothers Barry and Maurice. Their demo recordings with engineer Scott Glasel were heard by Clive Banks from the UK branch of Island Records. Gibb never formally signed a contract but the record label planned to release a single in Europe that spring, followed by another single that summer with the album to follow.

In early March 1988, Barry arranged for Island in England to sign Andy, but when he arrived in England in January 1988, he panicked. Andy missed meetings with the record company and blamed himself for his trouble writing songs. The deal was never signed.

Death
By late January to early February in 1988, Gibb had seemingly beaten his drug addiction, regained his health, and was ready to begin recording a new album; however, he still battled depression over his breakup with Victoria Principal. According to Robin Gibb, his brother "just went downhill so fast... he was in a terrible state of depression". During this period, Gibb slipped back into his alcoholic habits, even going as far as receiving phone calls from brothers Maurice and Barry (the latter call Barry would regret making), with last ditch efforts to get Andy to stop. 5 March 1988, Gibb celebrated his 30th birthday in London while working on the new album. Two days after celebrating his birthday, he entered John Radcliffe Hospital in Oxford complaining of chest pains.

At around 8:30 am on 10 March 1988, Gibb's doctor informed him more tests were needed to determine the cause of his chest pains. Shortly afterward, Gibb slumped into unconsciousness and died as a result of myocarditis, an inflammation of the heart muscle most likely caused by a virus. Years of cocaine abuse also weakened his heart, this diagnosis was supported by William Shell, a cardiologist who previously treated Gibb.

With the announcement of Gibb's death, his ex-wife, Kim Reeder, was not surprised. "I always knew that one day I'd get a call with news like this. It was only a matter of time." Gibb's family said the cause of death was not an overdose, as some media reports suggested, but natural causes after years of substance abuse.

Gibb's body was returned to the United States, where he was interred at Forest Lawn Memorial Park in Hollywood Hills, Los Angeles. The headstone reads "Andy Gibb / March 5, 1958 – March 10, 1988 / An Everlasting Love", after one of his hit singles.

Legacy
The Andy Gibb Memorial Foundation contributes to charities that Gibb supported, such as the American Heart Association, the American Cancer Society, and the Diabetes Research Institute.

Awards and nominations 
Gibb was nominated for two Grammy Awards at the 20th Annual Grammy Awards. He was also nominated for two American Music Awards.

Grammy Awards 

|-
| 1978
| Andy Gibb
| Best New Artist
| 
|-
| 1978
| "I Just Want to Be Your Everything"
| Best Pop Vocal Performance, Male
|

American Music Awards 

|-
| 1978
|"I Just Want To Be Your Everything"
| Favorite Pop/Rock Song
| 
|-
| 1979
| Andy Gibb
| Favorite Pop/Rock Male Artist
|

Discography

Studio albums

Compilations

Singles

Filmography

Television

References

External links

 

 

1958 births
1988 deaths
20th-century English male actors
20th-century English singers
20th-century British male singers
Burials at Forest Lawn Memorial Park (Hollywood Hills)
Deaths from myocarditis
English expatriates in Australia
English expatriates in Spain
English expatriates in the United States
English male singers
English male television actors
English people of Irish descent
English people of Scottish descent
English pop singers
English songwriters
Andy
Musicians from Manchester
RSO Records artists
Singers from Manchester
English male musical theatre actors
British male songwriters